The following is a timeline of the history of the city of Tijuana, Baja California, Mexico.

Prior to 20th century

 1829 - Land grant to Santiago Argüello in 1829, establishing Rancho Tía Juana in what was then, Alta California.
1839 - Kumeyaay raid on Tijuana.
1848 - End of the Mexican–American War. International border between US and Mexico formed north of Tijuana, city becomes part of Baja California.
1889 - Tijuana founded in Baja California Territory.
 1900 - Population: 243.

20th century

1900s-1950s
 1911 - Magonista rebellion of 1911 erupts in Northern Baja California, Tijuana is occupied by the Magonistas for several weeks.
 May 8/9 - First Battle of Tijuana; Magonistas capture Tijuana.
 June 22 - Second Battle of Tijuana; Mexico recaptures Tijuana
 1914 - El Hispano Americano newspaper begins publication.
 1916 - Hippodrome opens.
 1924 - Caesar salad invented by restaurateur Caesar Cardini.
 1925 - La Voz de Tijuana newspaper begins publication.
 1928 - Agua Caliente Casino and Hotel in business.
 1929 - Agua Caliente Racetrack opens.
 1930 - Baja California Territory split, Tijuana becomes part of Territorio Norte de Baja California.
 1940 - Population: 16,486.
 1943 - Red Cross established.
 1944 - Cine Zaragoza (movie theatre) opens.
 1946 - Jai alai arena opens.
 1950 - Population: 59,962.
 1951 - Cine Bujazan (movie theatre) opens.
 1953 - City becomes part of Tijuana Municipality in the state of Baja California.
 1954 - Gustavo Aubanel Vallejo becomes mayor.
 1957 - Autonomous University of Baja California, Tijuana established in Mesa de Otay.
 1958 - Tijuana Airport opens.
 1959
 Dorian's in business.
 Solo Angels Motorcycle Club formed.

1960s-1990s
 1960 - XEWT-TDT television begins broadcasting.
 1961 - XETRA radio begins all-news format.
 1964
 Catedral de Nuestra Señora de Guadalupe established.
 Tijuana Christian mission founded.
 1965 - National Border Industrialization Program begins.
 1970 - Centro de Enseñanza Técnica y Superior campus established.
 1971 - Escuela Preparatoria Federal Lázaro Cárdenas (school) and Highland Prince Academy de Mexico active.
 1973
 Cartolandia shantytown razed.
 Colonia Tierra y Libertad developed.
 1976 - Estadio Nacional de Tijuana (stadium) opens.
 1977 - La Casa de la Cultura Tijuana (cultural institution) established.
 1980
 Zeta newspaper begins publication.
 Population: 461,267.
 1982
 Tijuana Cultural Center opens.
 Plaza Río Tijuana (shopping centre) and Las Torres built.
 Northwest Aeronautical Institute established.
 1984 - Associacion de Mixtecos Residentes en Tijuana established.
 1986 - El Colegio de la Frontera Norte established.
 1990
 Orquesta de Baja California headquartered in city.
 Population: 698,752.
 1992
 Tijuana No! (musical group) active.
 inSITE art exhibition begins.
 1993 - Sister city relationship established with San Diego, USA.
 1994
 Cinépolis multiplex movie theatre in business.
 March 23: Politician Luis Donaldo Colosio assassinated.
 1995 - Population: 966,097.
 1998 - Instituto Municipal de Arte y Cultura established.
 1999 - Nortec Collective (musical group) active.
 2000 - Population: 1,148,681.

21st century

 2003
 Consejo Fronterizo de Arte y Cultura (arts organization) incorporated.
 Eudist Servants of the 11th Hour active (approximate date).
 2005
 Hospital Angeles Tijuana opens.
 Tijuana Cimarrones baseball team formed.
 2007
 Club Tijuana Xoloscuintles football team formed.
 Centro Médico Excel built.
 2008
 Police retrained.
 Park Towers built.
 Casa del Tunel art gallery and District 10 Gallery open.
 2009 - Green View Tower and VIA Corporativo built.
 2010
 April 4: 2010 Baja California earthquake.
 Masyid Al Islam (mosque) and La Caja Galería open.
 Carlos Bustamante Anchondo becomes mayor.
 Population: 1,300,983; municipality 1,559,683.
 2012 - Museum of Mariachi and Tequila opens.
 2015 - October: San Diego-Tijuana drug tunnel discovered.
2016 - Haitian migrant caravan arrives in Tijuana in October, forming the Pequeña Haití community.
2018 - Honduran migrant caravan arrives in Tijuana in November, many of whom are part of the LGBT community, settling mostly around the Playas de Tijuana area.
 2020 - Population: 1,810 645; municipality 1, 922,523.

Anticipated future event(s) 
2024 - Tijuana and San Diego set to host World Design Capital 2024.

See also

 List of mayors of Tijuana
 History of Tijuana (in Spanish)
 Baja California history (state)

References

This article incorporates information from the Spanish Wikipedia.

Bibliography

Published in 20th century
 
 
 T.D. Proffitt. 1994. Tijuana: The History of a Mexican Metropolis. San Diego: San Diego State University Press.
 
 

Published in 21st century

External links

 
Tijuana